Anders Jensen Løwlie (6 April 1843 – 9 March 1924) was a Norwegian businessman and sports official.

Løwlie was born in Romedal to farmer and blacksmith Jens Helgesen Løvlien and Randi Olsdatter Skee, and married Oline Augusta Jacobsen in 1877. He was manager of the distillery  from 1865, and of Kristiania Brændevinssamlag from 1886. Løwlie played a central role in development of the recipe for Løiten Akvavit, based on caraway from Dovre.

From 1887 to 1892 he chaired the sports association Centralforeningen for utbredelse af idræt.

He was a decorated Knight, First Class of the Order of St. Olav in 1901. He died in Oslo in 1924.

References

 

1843 births
1924 deaths
People from Stange
Drink distillers
Norwegian sports executives and administrators